{{DISPLAYTITLE:Kappa1 Coronae Australis}}

Kappa1 Coronae Australis (Kappa1 CrA), Latinized from κ1 Coronae Australis, is a star located in the southern constellation Corona Australis. It has an apparent magnitude of 6.17, placing it near the limit for naked eye visibility.

There has been some disagreement about the object's distance. New analysis from the Gaia spacecraft find that it has a physical relation to κ2 Coronae Australis. Both of their currently parallaxes place them around 700 light years away.

Kappa1 CrA has a stellar classification of A0 IV, indicating that it is a slightly evolved A-type star. Kappa1 CrA's metallicity – specifically the iron abundance – is 63% that of the Sun. With an age of about four million years, Kappa1 CrA is modelled to be a young star only about 10% of the way through its main sequence life.

References

External links
Server7.wikisky.org

Corona Australis
Corona Australis, Kappa1
6952
170867
090969
CD-38 12896
A-type subgiants
Coronae Australis, 16